Humdinger can refer to:
 Humdinger (computer), an 8 bit color computer from 1983
The Humdinger, a 2008 album by US rap group Nappy Roots
Humdinger, a 2002 album by American soul and R&B singer Aaron Neville
Humdinger, a 2006 album by Irish banjo player Enda Scahill and The Brock McGuire Band
 The Humdingers, a musical group that became the American doo-wop and R&B group The Showmen
 The Humdingers, an a capella musical group formed by Joe Oliva prior to The Essentials
 Humdinger, a 1997 album  by The Hoax, a group led by Robin Davey
 "Humdinger", a song by J. J. Cale from the album Travel-Log
 Humdinger, a brand of beer made by Joseph Holt's Brewery, England

See also